India and Papua New Guinea established diplomatic relations in 1975. Papua New Guinea has a High Commission in New Delhi, whilst India operates a High Commission in Port Moresby.

History
Relations started in 1975 when PNG became independent from Australia and ever since relations have grown. In 2010–11 fiscal year, Papua New Guinea-India trade reached US$239 Million. India has been educating many PNG officers/students and many Indians live in Papua New Guinea serving in sectors such as IT, Education, Government and Trade.

Trade 
In 2017, PNG and India  entered an Economic Partnership Agreement with a focus on investments and infrastructure projects in Papua New Guinea to facilitate more trade with India.

The President of the IETO and India Africa Trade Council (IATC) Dr. Asif Iqbal and the India Pacific Trade Council organized the Launch of Papua New Guinea coffee in India with the High Commissioner of Papua New Guinea H.E Paulias Korni OBE and the Finance Minister of Tamilnadu Palanivel Thiaga Rajan in Chennai with the Ministry of External Affairs Head of Secretariat Mr. Venkatachalam Murugan.

References

External links
Papua New Guinea High Commission to India, New Delhi
India High Commission to Papua New Guinea, Port Moresby

 
Papua New Guinea
India